Nagli is a surname. Notable people with the surname include:

Carlo Antonio Nagli (1680–1756), Italian composer
Giovanni Francesco Nagli (1615–1675), Italian painter

Italian-language surnames